Casino is a 1982 video game published by Datamost.

Gameplay
Casino is a game in which five games are included: Blackjack, Keno, Poker, Roulette and Baccarat.

Reception
Stuart Gorrie reviewed the game for Computer Gaming World, and stated that "Casino provides  user with a little personal touch. As you enter the Casino, you are greeted and asked your name. Casino knows if you have been here before, as, you see, it keeps track of  clientele. Casino knows all about you."

References

External links
Review in Softalk

1982 video games
Apple II games
Apple II-only games
Casino video games
Datamost games
Video games developed in the United States